The Lycée Voltaire is a secondary school in Paris, France, established in 1890.

History

The Lycée Voltaire was the first lycée in the east of Paris, and was intended to supplement classical humanities with practical and scientific knowledge suitable for the needs of the neighborhood.
The building was officially inaugurated on 13 July 1891 in a ceremony attended by Marie François Sadi Carnot, president of the Republic.
For a long time it was the only lycée in the northeast of Paris.
There were 152 students in the first year, 544 in 1904 and 792 in 1912.
A major renovation was undertaken from 1992 to 2002.
The  lycée today is a public secondary school for general education and technology.

Building

Eugène Train (1832–1903) was architect of the Lycée Voltaire, which was located on the Avenue de la République. Construction began in 1885.
The school was designed to accommodate 1,200 pupils, of whom 500 were boarders.
Construction was completed in September 1890.
The cost was divided between the state and the city of Paris.

The buildings are arranged around a central courtyard, courtyards to the east and west, and to the north a courtyard for physical education and sports.
Buildings included 47 classrooms and 17 studies, lecture rooms for physics (2), chemistry (2), history & geography (2). 
There is a collections room, drawing room, modeling workshops and a library.
A screening room was equipped by M. Gaumont.
The building includes four large apartments for senior staff and accommodation for 20 teachers and 20 domestic workers.
The decorations of the building included metal and ceramics.
A marble monument of Voltaire by Victor Ségoffin, meant for the Pantheon, now stands in the courtyard of the Lycee Voltaire.

Former pupils

Octave Aubry (1881–1946), novelist and historian
Yves Boisset (born 1939), film director
Fernand Braudel (1902–85), historian
Edgar Faure (1908–88), politician
Alain-Fournier (1886–1914), author 
Henri Krasucki (1924–2003), trade-unionist
Camille Le Tallec (1906–91), porcelain artist
Marcel L'Herbier (1888–1979), filmmaker 
André Michel Lwoff (1902–94), microbiologist
Aïssa Maïga (born 1975), actress
Guy Marchand (born 1937), actor, musician and singer
Jean Mermoz (1901–36), aviator
Claude Miller (1942– 2012), filmmaker 
Gilbert Montagné (born 1951), musician
Violette Nozière (1915–66), parricide
Jacques Revaux (born 1940), songwriter
Sagamore Stévenin (born 1974), actor
Julie Zenatti (born 1981), singer
Robinson Stévenin (born 1981), actor
Alan Stivell  (born 1944), musician
Guy Stroumsa (born 1948), professor of comparative religion
Pedro Winter  (born 1975), music producer

Serge Daney (1944 - 1992), film critic

Former teachers

Jean-Louis Bory (1919–79), writer, journalist and film critic
Alain Krivine (born 1941), Trotskyist politician
Albert Malet (1864–1915), historian 
Robert Mandrou (1921–84), historian
Jules Marouzeau (1878–1964), philologist
Émile Moselly (1870–1918), novelist.
Étienne Weill-Raynal (1887–1982), historian

Notes

Sources

Lycées in Paris
Buildings and structures in the 11th arrondissement of Paris
Educational institutions established in 1890
1890 establishments in France